Western Somali Democratic Party (WSDP; also known as Somali Galbed) is a political party in Ethiopia. It emerged from the Western Somali Liberation Front in 1975. The former President of the Somali Region, Hassan Jire Kalinle, has been the party chairman since 1994; the vice chairman of the party is Joseph Nur.

In the 2005 regional elections, the WSDP won one seat (of 182) in the legislature of the Somali Region. In 2000 it had won 3 out of 168. The principal strongholds of the WSDP's support is around Jigjiga, Kebri Dahar and Warder. In the 1995 elections, the WSDP won 15 of the 135 seats in the regional parliament and 1 of the 25 seats assigned to the Somali Region.

Notes

1975 establishments in Ethiopia
Ethnic political parties in Ethiopia
Political parties established in 1975
Political parties in Ethiopia